Harry Griffiths (1895 – 1987) was a Reverend who worked for the Methodist Inland Mission in Alice Springs; Northern Territory and is best remembered for establishing Griffiths House as well as designing and opening the ANZAC Hill memorial.

Early life 

English born Griffiths married his wife, Dorothy, after he was 'invalided out' of the British Army for injuries received as a medical orderly; serving in France during World War I. Griffiths was advised to move to a warmer climate and, not qualifying for assistance, he and Dorothy saved for the fares and initially settled in Melbourne.

When in Melbourne Griffiths became a home missionary and started the process to become ordained: during this process he was appointed to Katherine, Northern Territory.

Life in the Northern Territory 

In Katherine Griffiths went on patrols in the local area, often assisted by Dorothy who also helped isolated children with their correspondence lessons and taught Sunday School. The couple lived at the manse which they frugally furnished with beer cartons and tea crates.

Immediately following Griffiths ordination the couple were moved to Alice Springs where, in addition to his work as a Reverend, he offered medical and dental help; he went as far as to use his International work truck as an ambulance.

Shortly after their arrival Griffiths, as chairman of the trustees of the Returned and Services League of Australia, lobbied for the flat area around (what is now known as) ANZAC Hill to be set aside as a recreational reserve and also suggested a memorial be erected on top of ANZAC Hill. He designed the memorial and opened and dedicated it with a public address on ANZAC Day, 25 April 1934.

With the outbreak of World War II Griffiths was commissioned as an Army Chaplin and during the war worked in the Northern Territory, Victoria and Palestine. During the War Griffiths started work on the construction of Griffiths House, which was originally designed to be a hostel for young single people who had moved to Alice Springs for work, but by the time it was opened (on 5 July 1941), plans had already changed and it was immediately converted in to a social club for soldiers stationed in Alice Springs. After the war, and opening in 1945, the house was converted to provide hostel accommodation for children from remote areas of Central Australia so that they could attend school.

Griffiths was also chairman of the Alice Springs Progress Association.

Later life 

Griffiths and Dorothy left Alice Springs in 1952 when they moved to Murray Bridge.

Griffiths ashes were buried at ANZAC Hill in 1987.

Further reading 
An Australian adventure / [by] Harry Griffiths; https://trove.nla.gov.au/version/215358691

Griff : an account of the Methodist Inland Mission and particularly the service rendered by Rev. and Mrs Harry Griffiths / by E. R. Sexton; https://trove.nla.gov.au/version/19598159

References 

Methodist missionaries in Australia
Australian Methodist missionaries
1895 births
1987 deaths
20th-century Methodists